Robert Atty Bessing Airport , also known as Kolonel R.A. Bessing Airport, is an airport in Malinau, North Kalimantan, Indonesia. It is located in the Indonesian territory of Kalimantan on the island of Borneo.

Airlines and destinations

References

Airports in North Kalimantan